Haakon Sløgedal (14 July 1901 – 15 July 1979) was a Norwegian politician for the Christian Democratic Party.

He was born in Holum.

He was elected to the Norwegian Parliament from Vest-Agder in 1961, and was re-elected in the 1962 revote and the 1965 general election.

Sløgedal was a member of Søgne municipality council between 1995 and 1967, serving as deputy mayor in the periods 1957–1959, 1959–1963 and 1963–1965.

References

1901 births
1979 deaths
People from Søgne
Christian Democratic Party (Norway) politicians
Members of the Storting
20th-century Norwegian politicians